Yanis Begraoui (born 4 July 2001) is a French professional footballer who plays as a forward for  club Pau on loan from Toulouse.

Club career
A youth product of FC Étampes and CS Brétigny, Begraoui signed with Auxerre in the summer of 2017. At the age of 16, he made his professional debut for the club in a 2–1 Ligue 2 loss to Clermont on 13 April 2018.

In the 2021–22 season, Begraoui won Ligue 2 with Toulouse.

On 29 January 2023, Begraoui was loaned to Pau in Ligue 2 until the end of the 2022–23 season.

International career
Begraoui was born in France and is of Moroccan descent, with roots in the Moroccan city Meknes. He is a former France youth international.

Honours 
Toulouse
 Ligue 2: 2021–22

References

External links
 
 
 
 
 

2001 births
Living people
People from Étampes
Footballers from Essonne
Association football forwards
French footballers
France youth international footballers
French sportspeople of Moroccan descent
AJ Auxerre players
Toulouse FC players
Pau FC players
Ligue 1 players
Ligue 2 players
Championnat National 2 players
Championnat National 3 players